Sturges v. Crowninshield, 17 U.S. (4 Wheat.) 122 (1819), dealt with the constitutionality of New York creating bankruptcy laws and retroactively applying those laws.

First issue
This case decided whether state bankruptcy laws violated the provision in Article I, Section 8 of the Constitution giving Congress the power "to establish ... uniform laws on the subject of bankruptcies throughout the United states". This was a power which Congress exercised in the Bankruptcy Act of 1800, the first federal bankruptcy law in American history. Were the states restricted from passing bankruptcy laws of their own?

Chief Justice Marshall stated in the opinion:

Chief Justice Marshall's answer to this question was not very clear.

In Ogden v. Saunders, eight years later, Justice Johnson explained why the ruling was so vague:

In other words, the Republican judges wanted to retain all state bankruptcy laws and the Federalists wanted to abolish them all. Minority Republicans agreed on the best bargain they could by agreeing to sacrifice the New York law if the rest were not deemed unconstitutional.

Second issue
In addition, the Supreme Court addressed the issue of whether retroactive application of the particular New York bankruptcy law in question was a "law impairing the Obligation of Contracts", in violation of Article I, Section 10 of the U.S. Constitution. This law covered debts contracted before the law was passed. The retroactive portion of the law was ruled to be unconstitutional by a unanimous court, because it impaired the debtors obligation to a contract.

See also
 List of United States Supreme Court cases, volume 17

Notes

External links

United States Constitution Article One case law
United States Supreme Court cases
United States Supreme Court cases of the Marshall Court
Contract Clause case law
United States ex post facto case law
United States bankruptcy case law
Legal history of New York (state)
1819 in United States case law
1819 in New York (state)